Themba Mnguni (born 16 December 1973) is a retired South African football player who played mostly for Mamelodi Sundowns and Supersport United.

He played for South Africa national soccer team and was in part of the squad that travelled to France for the 1998 FIFA World Cup.

References

External links

Profile at FIFA.COM

1973 births
Living people
South African soccer players
South Africa international soccer players
1998 FIFA World Cup players
1998 African Cup of Nations players
Mamelodi Sundowns F.C. players
SuperSport United F.C. players
Orlando Pirates F.C. players
AmaZulu F.C. players
Association football defenders